The reginia primrose moth (Schinia regina) is a moth of the family Noctuidae. It is found from southern and western Texas, north to the panhandle, north-western Oklahoma, Kansas, Nebraska and west to southern New Mexico and eastern Colorado.

The wingspan is 26–30 mm. Adults are on wing from August to September.

The larvae feed on Palafoxia sphacelata.

External links
Images
A Review of the Schinia regia species complex

Schinia
Moths of North America
Moths described in 2003